Lee Jung-shin (born September 15, 1991) is a South Korean musician, singer, rapper, and actor. He is the bassist of South Korean rock band CNBLUE, which debuted in January 2010 in South Korea.

Life and career

Early life and career beginning
Lee Jung-shin was born on September 15, 1991 in Seoul. His family consists of his parents and an older brother. His family lives in Ilsan, and he finished high school at Jung Bal High School in Ilsan.

Lee trained under FNC Entertainment in 2009, and in September of that year joined CNBLUE as a bassist, replacing Kwon Kwang-jin who left the band shortly after debut. Aside from being the band's bassist, he also serves as a rapper and backup vocalist.

Solo career

Lee made his acting debut in 2012 KBS2 family drama Seoyoung, My Daughter. It recorded a peak viewership rating of 47.6%, making it the highest rated Korean drama of 2013. Lee received praise for his performance, and garnered several "Best New Actor" nominations from local award giving bodies.

Lee was subsequently cast in supporting roles in saeguk The Blade and Petal (2013) and melodrama Temptation (2014); the later won him his first acting award, as "Best New Rising Star" at the 3rd DramaFever Awards.

In 2015, Lee played his first leading role in the KBS2 drama special Thank You, My Son. The same year, he became a host of Mnet's M Countdown alongside Key of SHINee. He subsequently left the show in 2016.

In 2016, Lee starred alongside Jung Il-woo and Park So-dam in tvN's romantic comedy, Cinderella with Four Knights. He released his first solo single, "Confession" for the drama's soundtrack.

In 2017, Lee starred in historical romance drama, My Sassy Girl. The same year, he was cast in fantasy romance drama Longing Heart. This marks his first lead role.

International Network of Street Papers announced Lee's photo has been included in the Top 5 nominees for INSP Awards for Best Photograph on June 7, 2019. Lee took photos from LOVE FNC Foundation's volunteer movement in Myanmar last February 2018 and contributed these photos exclusively to The Big Issue Korea for free. The winner was announced on INSP Awards Ceremony which held as part of the Global Street Paper Summit in Hannover, Germany, on June 19.

On July 22, 2019, Lee released his Japanese single, Blue Orion. He then dropped the album with this song and four more Japanese tracks on September 25.

In March 2021, Lee made his acting comeback following his military discharge in the web series, Summer Guys. The series aired on KT Seezn, AbemaTV, and Viu.

In September 2021, Lee was cast in the drama, Sh**ting Stars alongside Lee Sung-Kyung and Kim Young-dae.

Philanthropy
Lee held a charitable photo exhibition along with his brother, Lee Yong Shin from June 1 to 10, 2018, at Canon Gallery, Seoul Gangnam Canon Plex B1/F, 829 Seolleung Road. The exhibition entitled, We Blew Away Dandelion Puffs, captured the moments from their visit to the fourth LOVE FNC School in Kalaw and YWAM day care center in Yangon in Myanmar last February. They were with AOA's Kim Seol Hyun as part of a project organized by LOVE FNC Foundation. The framed photographs, postcards, and posters are for sale. The proceeds will be donated to fund a scholarship program in Myanmar.

On April 7, 2019, Hope Bridge National Disaster Relief Association reported Lee donated 10 million won for the victims of forest fires in Gangwon Province.

On October 25, 2021, Lee along with Korean photographer, Alex Kim held a V Live to support Alex Primary School Surongo in the Himalayas. The broadcast is partnered with LOVE FNC Foundation and Naver's Happybean Foundation.

Mandatory military service
Lee enlisted in his military service on July 31, 2018.

He finished his basic military training, posting his photos on his personal Instagram account on September 5.

Lee hosted the Armed Forces Festival on October 8, 2018. The event was held from October 5 to 9. He was also the emcee for the military music concert, celebrating the 70th Anniversary of soldier establishment on October 10, 2018.

Lee was officially discharged from his military service on March 19, 2020, without returning to his base from his ETS leave according to the Ministry of National Defense’s policy.

Discography

Soundtracks appearances

Songwriting and production credits

Filmography

Television series

Web series

Television shows

Awards and nominations

References

External links

 
 

1991 births
CNBLUE members
FNC Entertainment artists
Living people
People from Seoul
South Korean bass guitarists
South Korean male idols
South Korean male television actors
South Korean male rappers
South Korean pop rock singers
Male bass guitarists
21st-century bass guitarists